The Federación Internacional de Pádel (English: International Padel Federation) is the world governing body for the sport padel, founded in 1991 in Madrid by the Argentinian, the Spanish and the Uruguayan Federation legal representatives. It is a non-profit making organisation whose goal is to promote all forms of padel around the world. It organizes the Padel World Championship for male and female players.

Presidents 
 1991–1993 Julio Alegría Artiach (Spain)
 1993–1996 Diógenes de Urquiza Anchorena (Argentina)
 1996–2000 Diógenes de Urquiza Anchorena (Argentina)
 2003–2006 Eduardo Góngora Benítez de Lugo (Spain)
 2006–2008 Adilson Hilário Dallagnol (Brazil)
 2008–2012 Adilson Hilário Dallagnol (Brazil)
 2012–2016 Daniel Alejandro Patti (Italy)
 2016–2018 Daniel Alejandro Patti (Italy)
 2018–present Luigi Carraro (Italy)

Affiliates 
Asociación Amigos Pádel Uruguay
Asociación Deportiva Nacional de Padel de Guatemala
Asociación Pádel Argentino
Australian Padel Federation
Confederaçao Brasileira de Pádel
Dansk Padel Forbund

Deutscher Padel Verband e.V.
Fédération Belge de Padel
Federación de Pádel de Chile
Federación Española de Pádel
French Tennis Federation 
Federazione Italiana Tennis
Federación Mexicana de Pádel
Federation de Padel de Monaco
Federación Paraguaya de Pádel
Federaçao Portuguesa de Padel
Federación Dominicana de Padel
Lithuanian Padel Federation
Nederlandse Padelbond

Österreichischer Padel Verband
Padel Association of Canada
Indian Padel Federation

Schweizer Padel Verband
Svenska Padelförbundet
United Kingdom Padel Federation
United States Padel Association
United Arab Emirates Padel Association

See also

References

External links 
 International Padel Federation

International sports organizations
Organisations based in Madrid
Organizations established in 1991